Entel may refer to:

Companies
 Entel (Bolivia), a Bolivian state-owned telecommunications company
 Entel (Chile), a Chilean telecommunications company
 Entel PCS, a mobile phone operator, subsidiary of the Chilean company
 Entel (Peru), a company maded from the Chilean
 ENTel, a former Argentinian state-owned telecommunications company

Buildings and structures
 Torre Entel, a telecommunications tower in Chile

People
 Nicolas Entel, a film producer